The Florence–Faenza railway, also known as Faentina railway, is a railway line in Italy.

History 
The line was opened in several sections as follows:
 Fognano–Faenza on 9 January 1887
 Marradi–Fognano on 26 August 1888
 Florence–Borgo San Lorenzo on 8 April 1890
 Borgo San Lorenzo–Marradi on 21 April 1893

During the Second World War, the railway was heavily damaged by retreating German troops on the Gothic Line which made it unsuitable for railway services until 1954. However, the services were only restored between Faenza and San Piero a Sieve, forcing the Florence-bound trains to reverse at Borgo San Lorenzo into the Borgo San Lorenzo-Pontassieve railway, with the railway services to San Piero a Sieve being withdrawn in the 1970s. 

In 1999, the Faentina was entirely refurbished and the track from Borgo San Lorenzo to Florence was reopened via San Piero a Sieve, Vaglia and Fiesole.

Current Services

At present days the railway is served by Regional Trains Faenza-Firenze Santa Maria Novella calling at Brisighella, Fognano, San Cassiano, San Martino in Gattara, Marradi, Biforco, Crespino del Lamone, Ronta, Borgo San Lorenzo, San Piero a Sieve, Vaglia, Fiesole-Caldine and Firenze San Marco Vecchio. Some of these trains make less stops for a faster service calling at Brisighella, Marradi, Ronta, Borgo San Lorenzo, San Piero a Sieve, Vaglia, Fiesole-Caldine and Firenze San Marco Vecchio. 

There is also a daily regional train operating, except on Sundays and Public Holidays, between Ravenna and Firenze Santa Maria Novella calling at Godo, Russi, Granarolo Faentino, Faenza, Brisighella, Fognano, San Cassiano, San Martino in Gattara, Marradi, Biforco, Crespino del Lamone, Ronta, Borgo San Lorenzo, San Piero a Sieve, Vaglia, Fiesole-Caldine and Firenze San Marco Vecchio.

During the summer service, the line is also served by two Regional Trains between Firenze Santa Maria Novella and Rimini:

R34049 Firenze Santa Maria Novella-Rimini calling at: Firenze San Marco Vecchio, Fiesole-Caldine, Vaglia, San Piero a Sieve, Borgo San Lorenzo, Ronta, Marradi, Brisighella, Faenza, Granarolo Faentino, Russi, Godo, Ravenna, Lido di Classe-Lido di Savio, Cervia-Milano Marittima, Cesenatico, Bellaria, Igea Marina and Rimini Viserba (operates on Sundays and Public Holidays)

R34503 Firenze Santa Maria Novella-Rimini calling at: Firenze Campo Marte, Pontassieve, Rufina, Scopeti, Contea-Londa, Dicomano, Vicchio, Borgo San Lorenzo, Ronta, Crespino del Lamone, Biforco, Marradi, San Martino in Gattara, Brisighella, Faenza, Granarolo Faentino, Russi, Godo, Ravenna, Lido di Classe-Lido di Savio, Cervia-Milano Marittima, Cesenatico, Bellaria and Igea Marina (operates daily).

During October Sundays there are special trains between Florence, Rimini, Faenza and Bologna to Marradi for the Sagra delle Castagne event.

Stations

At present days, the railway line has the following stations:

Faenza (Terminus)
Brisighella
Fognano
Strada Casale
San Cassiano
San Martino in Gattara
Popolano di Marradi
Marradi
Biforco
Crespino del Lamone
Ronta
Borgo San Lorenzo
San Piero a Sieve
Campomigliaio
Vaglia
Fiesole-Caldine
Pian di Mugnone
Firenze San Marco Vecchio
Firenze Santa Maria Novella (Terminus)

The following stations are only served by 4 train services a day:

Strada Casale
Popolano di Marradi
Campomigliaio (together with some Borgo San Lorenzo-Firenze Campo Marte trains).

The railway station of Pian di Mugnone is only served by a few trains a day between Borgo San Lorenzo and Firenze Campo Marte

The following stations have been dismissed:

Sant'Eufemia di Brisighella
Panicaglia
Fontebuona
Cercina
Montorsoli (converted into a signalling control)
Mimmole
Salviati

See also 
 List of railway lines in Italy

References

Footnotes

Sources
 
 
  

Railway lines in Emilia-Romagna
Railway lines in Tuscany
Railway lines opened in 1893
Standard gauge railways in Italy